hVamp6/Vps39-like protein is a protein that in humans is encoded by the VPS39 gene.

This gene encodes a protein that may promote clustering and fusion of late endosomes and lysosomes. The protein may also act as an adaptor protein that modulates the transforming growth factor-beta response by coupling the transforming growth factor-beta receptor complex to the Smad pathway.

References

Further reading